The Five Freedoms Forum (FFF) was a group of anti-apartheid organizations made up of mostly white people. It was launched in Johannesburg on 18 March 1987. The name of the group was based on five freedoms: "freedom from want, freedom from fear, freedom from discrimination, freedom of speech and association and freedom of conscience." Several organizations fell under the umbrella of the Five Freedoms Forum including NUSAS, Black Sash, Young Christian Students, Jodac, the Catholic Church Commission for Justice and Peace, Concerned Social Workers, Jews for Social Justice and the Detainees' Parents Support Committee. The Five Freedoms Forum organized a two-day conference of 800 delegates in September 1987, which was the first "nationwide meeting of South African white groups opposed to apartheid." In 1989, an anti-apartheid campaigner, David Webster, who was white and involved with the Five Freedoms Forum, was assassinated.

References

External links 
 The Five Freedoms Forum (FFF) Collection

Anti-Apartheid organisations
1987 establishments in South Africa